Chorriyan Chhoron Se Kam Nahi Hoti is a Haryanvi language film starring Satish Kaushik, Rashmi Somvanshi, Annirudh Dave, Mohan Kant, Prakash Ghai and Gautam Saugat. The story is centered around a girl's struggle to study and become an IPS Officer. Despite, getting no support from her father at home; who thinks “Girls are meant for Household chores only”; she fights all odds to prove her father wrong and goes on to join the prestigious IPS. The film won Best Feature Film in Haryanvi Language at 67th National Film Awards.

Cast 
 Satish Kaushik as Jaidev Choudhary
 Rashmi Somvanshi as Binita Choudhary
 Annirudh Dave as Vikas
 Mohan Kant as Baldev Singh
 Prakash Ghai as Veerdev Choudhary
 Gautam Saugat
 Kuldeep Singh as Master ji
 Sanjay Ramphal
 Jagbir Rathi
 Vishwa Deepak Trikha

References

External links 
 Chorriyan Chhoron Se Kam Nahi Hoti at YouTube

Chhorriyan Chhoron Se Kam Nahi Hoti at ZEE5

2019 films
2010s Hindi-language films